The following is a chronological list of Austrian classical composers: that is, those who live in, work in, or are citizens of Austria.

Baroque
Johann Heinrich Schmelzer (1623–1680)
Heinrich Ignaz Franz Biber (1644–1704)
Georg Reutter (1656–1738)
Johann Joseph Fux (1660–1741)
Johann Joseph Vilsmayr (1663–1722)
Johann Georg Reinhardt (1676–1742)
Johann Baptist Peyer (c.1678–1733)
Gregor Joseph Werner (1693–1766)
Joseph Balthasar Hochreither (1669–1731)
Carl Georg Reutter (1708–1772)

Classical era
Joseph Riepel (1709–1782)
Franz Xaver Richter (1709–1789)
Ignaz Jacob Holzbauer (1711–1783)
Josephus Johannes Baptizta Bon (1711–1788)
Georg Christoph Wagenseil (1715–1777)
Georg Matthias Monn (1717–1750)
Wenzel Raimund Birck (1718–1763)
Leopold Mozart (1719–1787)
Joseph Friebert (1724–1799)
Josef Starzer (1726–1787)
Karl Kohaut (1726–1784)
Franz Aspelmayr (1728–1786)
Franz Kreibich (1728-1797)
Franz Joseph Aumann (1728–1797)
Florian Leopold Gassmann (1729–1774)
Franz Joseph Haydn (1732–1809)
Christoph Sonnleithner (1734–1786)
Karl von Ordóñez (1734–1786)
Johann Georg Albrechtsberger (1736–1809)
Johann Michael Haydn (1737–1806)
Leopold Hoffman (1738–1793)
Carl Ditters von Dittersdorf (1739–1799)
Johann Baptist Wanhal (1739–1813)
Anton Zimmermann (1741–1781)
Marianne von Martinez (1744–1812)
Ignaz Umlauf (1746–1796)
Franz Paul Rigler (1747–1796)
Maximilian Johann Karl Stadler (1748–1833)
Johannes Matthias Sperger (1750–1812)
Ferdinand August Kauer (1751–1831)
Johann Baptist Schenk (1753–1836)
Wolfgang Amadeus Mozart (1756–1791)
Franz Grill (1756–1793)
Anton Teyber (1756–1822)
Ignace Joseph Pleyel (1757–1831)
Franz Teyber (1758–1810)
Josepha Barbara Auernhammer (1758–1820)
Joseph Gelinek (1758–1825)
Maria Theresa von Paradis (1759–1824)
Jakob Haibel (1762–1826)
Franz Xaver Gerl (1764–1827)
Anton Eberl (1765–1807)
Joseph Leopold Eybler (1765–1846)
Franz Xaver Süssmayr (1766–1803)
Joseph Weigl (1766–1846)
Leonhard von Call (1767–1815)
Wenzel Müller (1767–1835)
Johann Baptist Henneberg (1768–1822)
Nikolaus von Krufft (1779–1818)

Romantic

Johann Georg Lickl (1769–1843)
Ignaz von Seyfried (1776–1841)
Franz Weiss (1778–1830)
Johann Nepomuk Hummel (1778–1837)
Johann Baptist Gänsbacher (1778–1844)
Sigismond von Neukomm (1778–1858)
Franz Clement (1780–1842)
Michael Umlauf (1781–1842)
Anton Diabelli (1781–1858)
Wenzel Robert von Gallenberg (1783–1839)
Tobias Haslinger (1787–1842)
Joseph Mayseder (1789–1863)
Ignaz Aßmayer (1790–1862)
Carl Czerny (1791–1857)
Franz Xaver Mozart (1791–1844)
Franz Schubert (1797–1828)
Joseph Franz Karl Lanner (1801–1843)
Johann Strauss I (1804–1849)
Johann Baptist Krall (1803–1883)
Anton Emil Titl (1809–1882)
Anton Bruckner (1824–1896)
Johann Strauss II (1825–1899)
Josef Strauss (1827–1870)
Eduard Strauss (1835–1916)
August Lanner (1835–1855)
Johann Nepomuk Fuchs (1842–1899)
Carl Michael Ziehrer (1843–1922)
Robert Fuchs (1847–1927)
Elkan Bauer (1852–1942)
Johann Pehel (1852–1926)
Hans Rott (1858–1884)
Hugo Wolf (1860–1903)
Gustav Mahler (1860–1911)
Johann Strauss III (1866–1939)

Modern/Contemporary
Oscar Straus (1870–1954)
Alexander von Zemlinsky (1871–1942) 
Walter Rabl (1873–1940)
Franz Schmidt (1874–1939)
Arnold Schoenberg (1874–1951)
Fritz Kreisler (1875–1962)
Franz Schreker (1878–1934)
Robert Stolz (1880–1975)
Anton Webern (1883–1945)
Alban Berg (1885–1935)
Egon Joseph Wellesz (1885–1974)
Ernst Krenek (1900–1991)
Theodor Berger (1905–1992)
Erich Zeisl (1905–1959)
Friedrich Cerha (1926–2023)
Georg Friedrich Haas (born 1953)
Beat Furrer (born 1954)
Bernard Lang (born 1957)
Lukas Ligeti (born 1965)
Olga Neuwirth (born 1968)
Klaus Lang (born 1971)

Composers
Austrian
Composers